Gregory Francis Murphy (born March 5, 1963) is an American politician and urologist representing North Carolina's 3rd congressional district in the U.S. House of Representatives since 2019. He served as a representative in the North Carolina General Assembly from 2015 to 2019.

Early life and education
Murphy was raised in Raleigh, North Carolina, and attended Needham B. Broughton High School. After high school, he attended Davidson College as an Edward Crosland Stuart Scholar. He then completed medical school at the University of North Carolina at Chapel Hill, where he graduated as a member of the Alpha Omega Alpha medical honor society.

After completing his residency in Urology and Renal Transplantation at the University of Kentucky, he and his wife settled in Greenville, North Carolina to begin his practice.

Medical career
Murphy has traveled as a medical missionary. When he was 20 years old, he spent a summer in Bihar, India, working in a Catholic leprosy hospital. Murphy performed medical missionary work in Haiti after the 2010 earthquake.

Murphy served as president of a medical practice and also as Chief of Staff of Vidant Medical Center. He was a member of the ECU School of Medicine faculty and served as Davidson College Alumni President from 2015 to 2017 while also serving on the board of trustees.

In 2017, Murphy received a Distinguished Leadership Award from the American Association of Clinical Urologists.

North Carolina General Assembly

Elections
Murphy was appointed to the North Carolina General Assembly in November 2015 and served the 9th District of Pitt County, to finish the term of Brian Brown, who had resigned.

On November 8, 2016, he was elected to the seat, defeating Brian Farkas with 22,540 votes (57.52%) to Farkas's 16,648 (42.48%).

Murphy was reelected in 2018, defeating Kristoffer (Kris) Rixon.

Tenure
During his second term in the General Assembly, Murphy served as Senior Chair of Health Policy and championed several health care initiatives. In 2017, he introduced the STOP Act (Strengthen Opioid Misuse Prevention Act), North Carolina's first major legislative initiative to confront the opioid epidemic. Murphy then introduced the HOPE Act, which helped law enforcement curtail drug trafficking. These two initiatives, along with other interventions, were credited with reducing North Carolina's opioid overdose deaths for the first time in over a decade.

Murphy introduced legislation that helped veterans get access to hyperbaric oxygen therapy as treatment for traumatic brain injuries and post-traumatic stress disorder. After the deaths of three newborns in eastern North Carolina, he introduced legislation to improve birthing standards for birth centers in North Carolina.

State legislative committees

U.S. House of Representatives

Elections

2019 special 

In 2019, Murphy announced his candidacy for the United States House of Representatives special election in North Carolina's 3rd congressional district to replace Walter B. Jones Jr., who died in office. Murphy won the runoff on July 9, 2019, against pediatrician Joan Perry, 59.7% to 40.3%. In the September 10 general election, he defeated former Greenville Mayor Allen M. Thomas, 61.7% to 37.5%.

2020
In 2020, Murphy was unopposed in the Republican primary for his seat. He won the general election over Democratic nominee Daryl Farrow with 63.5% of the vote.

Committee assignments
 Committee on Ways and Means

Caucus memberships 
 Doctors Caucus
Military Depot and Industrial Facilities Caucus
Southern Border Caucus
Shipbuilding Caucus
Taiwan Caucus
Republican Study Committee

Political positions

Chinese espionage
As a result of Chinese espionage at American universities, Murphy introduced the INFLUENCE Act, aimed at reducing the number of Chinese nationals attending American higher education institutions. While requiring higher education institutions to report gifts of $50,000 or more from a foreign source, Murphy's legislation also establishes interagency coordination on the enforcement of any violations exposing U.S. national security projects.

Joe Biden

During the 2020 presidential campaign, Murphy claimed on Twitter that Joe Biden "obviously is fighting the ravages of dementia." Questioned about the assertion by a reporter, Murphy, a urologist, said he was only echoing what the public thinks. "The majority of American people believe he does have dementia", he said.

Kamala Harris

In an October 2020 tweet that later was deleted, Murphy called Democratic vice presidential nominee Kamala Harris a "walking disaster" who "was only picked for her color and her race".

Controversial 9/11 tweet

Murphy was condemned for a tweet directed at Representative Ilhan Omar, a Muslim who, while speaking at a 2019 fundraiser for Council on American–Islamic Relations (CAIR), called the September 11 attacks an event where "some people did something".

"Heartbroken to learn another CP was killed while protecting the Capitol", Omar wrote after an April 2 incident. "My thoughts and prayers go out to the officer's family and the entire Capitol Police force. The death toll would have been worse if the assailant had an AR-15 instead of a knife." Murphy responded, "Would have been worse if they had been flying planes into the buildings also".

Davidson College controversy

Murphy was among 11 co-signers of a letter criticizing his alma mater, Davidson College, for recently removing a requirement that its president and most trustees be Christian. In a May 2021 email to alumni from an official-looking address, the group said Davidson had strayed from its religious roots and "wandered into the realm of political and social activism."

In a follow-up message titled "Unauthorized Davidson Alumni Email", Davidson's alumni office said it "did not authorize the release of alumni email addresses, the use of our name or the contents of the email." It said its IT staff was investigating and "taking this matter very seriously".

Texas v. Pennsylvania
In December 2020, Murphy was one of 126 Republican members of the House of Representatives to sign an amicus brief in support of Texas v. Pennsylvania, a lawsuit filed at the United States Supreme Court contesting the results of the 2020 presidential election, in which Biden defeated Trump. The Supreme Court declined to hear the case on the basis that Texas lacked standing under Article III of the Constitution to challenge the results of an election held by another state.

Objection during 2021 United States Electoral College vote count

In January 2021, Murphy was one of several Republican members of the House, led by Representative Mo Brooks of Alabama and Senator Josh Hawley of Missouri, who declared that they would formally object to the counting of the electoral votes of five swing states won by Biden during the January 6 joint session. The objections would then trigger votes from both houses.

At least 140 House Republicans reportedly planned to vote against the counting of electoral votes, despite the lack of any credible allegation of an irregularity that would have affected the election, and the allegations' rejections by courts, election officials, the Electoral College, and others, and despite the fact that almost all of the Republican objectors had "just won elections in the very same balloting they are now claiming was fraudulently administered".

Murphy said in a press release the day before the joint session, "I have been quite vocal in stating that to preserve the integrity of our elections, we must fight to ensure that every voice is heard, every legal vote is counted, and every count is confirmed", adding that he believed the actions of executive officials and judges in several states were "at best troubling and at worst seditious."

After the storming of the United States Capitol by a mob of rioters supporting Trump's attempts to overturn the 2020 presidential election, Murphy voted to agree with the objection to Pennsylvania's results.

Second impeachment of Donald Trump
Murphy did not cast a vote on Trump's second impeachment on January 13, 2021. He released a statement that he "strongly opposed" the impeachment but he would miss the vote because he was with his wife as she recovered from a surgery.

Abortion and rape
In June 2022, Murphy tweeted and two hours later deleted a comment regarding the overturning of Roe v. Wade in the case of rape: "no one forces anyone to have sex." According to the CDC, nearly one in five women is a victim of rape or attempted rape in her lifetime, and men are sometimes raped as well.

Electoral history

References

External links
Congressman Greg Murphy official U.S. House website
 Campaign website
 
North Carolina General Assembly page 

|-

|-

1963 births
Living people
American urologists
Davidson College alumni
People from Greenville, North Carolina
Physicians from North Carolina
21st-century American physicians
Politicians from Raleigh, North Carolina
Republican Party members of the North Carolina House of Representatives
21st-century American politicians
Republican Party members of the United States House of Representatives from North Carolina
University of North Carolina alumni
Candidates in the 2019 United States elections